Marsden Road Public School is a primary school in Liverpool, New South Wales.

History 
Established in 1962 the school was built on lands of the Cabrogal of the Darug Nation. According to the school's published website, it's three core principles are "to be safe, to be respectful, and to be learners".

Notable Alumni 
Former Australian cricketer Michael Clarke attended the school.

References

Public primary schools in Sydney
Liverpool, New South Wales